Krzewiny may refer to the following places:
Krzewiny, Kuyavian-Pomeranian Voivodeship (north-central Poland)
Krzewiny, Łódź Voivodeship (central Poland)
Krzewiny, Lubusz Voivodeship (west Poland)
Krzewiny, Pomeranian Voivodeship (north Poland)